Xinghua Bay is an inlet of the Taiwan Strait beside Putian in Fujian on the Chinese mainland. It is fed by the Mulan River and Qiulu Creek (Qiūlú Xī). Administratively, it is surrounded by Putian's Xiuyu, Licheng, and Hanjiang Districts to the south and west and by Fuzhou's city of Fuqing and the islands of its Pingtan County to the north and northeast.

See also
 Xinghua Prefecture

Bays of China
Bodies of water of Fujian